Galacantha is a genus of squat lobsters in the family Munidopsidae, containing the following species:
 Galacantha bellis Henderson, 1885
 Galacantha diomedeae Faxon, 1893
 Galacantha quiquei Macpherson, 2007
 Galacantha rostrata A. Milne Edwards, 1880
 Galacantha spinosa A. Milne Edwards, 1880
 Galacantha subrostrata Macpherson, 2007
 Galacantha subspinosa Macpherson, 2007
 Galacantha trachynotus Anderson, 1896
 Galacantha valdiviae Balss, 1913

References

Squat lobsters